Maxim Vladimirovich Mamin (born 13 January 1995) is a Russian professional ice hockey forward currently playing for the HC CSKA Moscow in the Kontinental Hockey League (KHL). He was drafted 175th overall in the 2016 NHL Entry Draft by the Florida Panthers.

Playing career
He made his professional debut in the Kontinental Hockey League (KHL) with CSKA Moscow during the 2014–15 season. He concluded his rookie campaign with 5 goals and 10 points in 39 games.

On 2 June 2017, Mamin left CSKA and agreed to a two-year, entry-level contract with the Florida Panthers. He was then sent to the Panthers AHL affiliate, the Springfield Thunderbirds. Mamin was called up to the NHL on 1 January 2018. He made his NHL debut on 7 January against the Columbus Blue Jackets before being sent back to the AHL on 12 January. Mamin was recalled on 29 January and he recorded his first NHL goal on 22 February 2018, against the Washington Capitals.

During the 2018–19 season, Mamin appeared in 7 scoreless games with the Panthers. Unable to secure a regular role within the roster, Mamin was loaned by the Panthers to former KHL club, CSKA Moscow, for the remainder of the season on 19 November 2018. Mamim scored 3 points in 25 games with CSKA, however made his biggest impact in the playoffs, scoring the Championship winning goal for CSKA against Avangard Omsk to claim the Gagarin Cup.

On 30 April 2019, as an impending restricted free agent by the Panthers, Mamin opted to continue his second stint with CKSA, signing a two-year contract through 2021.

At the conclusion of his contract with CSKA, having developed into a consistent scoring threat with the club, Mamin opted to return to the NHL in signing a one-year, $975,000 contract with the Panthers on July 28, 2021. In the  season, Mamin played in a depth forward role in setting NHL career bests in recording 7 goals and 14 points through 40 regular season games with the Presidents' Trophy winning Panthers.

As a free agent from the Panthers, Mamin opted to return again to Russia in re-joining CSKA Moscow on a three-year contract on 13 July 2022.

Career statistics

Regular season and playoffs

International

Awards and honors

References

External links
 

1995 births
Living people
Charlotte Checkers (2010–) players
HC CSKA Moscow players
Florida Panthers draft picks
Florida Panthers players
Russian ice hockey forwards
Springfield Thunderbirds players
Ice hockey people from Moscow